Private is the first book of the Jack Morgan series.  This novel was written by James Patterson and Maxine Paetro.  The Private London series was spun off from the Jack Morgan series.

Reviews
This book has been reviewed by readers on at least three websites.  On the Amazon.com website 219 reviewers gave Private an average of three of five possible stars.  On the goodreads website the book had 650 reviews as of February 2012.  Reviewers gave Private 3.73 stars of a possible five stars.  The Reader Store website had nine reviews as of February 2012.  The book only rated two of five stars on this site.

References

2010 American novels
Little, Brown and Company books
Novels by James Patterson
Collaborative novels